The fifth season of The Real Housewives of Potomac, an American reality television series, is broadcast on Bravo. It aired from August 2 to December 27, 2020, and is primarily filmed in Potomac, Maryland. Its executive producers are Steven Weinstock, Glenda Hersh, Lauren Eskelin, Lorraine Haughton-Lawson, Thomas Kelly and Andy Cohen. The season focuses on the lives of Gizelle Bryant, Ashley Darby, Robyn Dixon, Karen Huger, Monique Samuels, Candiace Dillard Bassett  and Wendy Osefo.

This season marked the final appearance of Monique Samuels.

Cast and synopsis
In November 2019, reports were published of a physical altercation between housewives Candiace Dillard and Monique Samuels, while filming for the fifth season. As a result, charges were filed and subsequently dropped against both Dillard and Samuels.

In March 2020, it was announced the series would return May 3, 2020, with the cast of the fourth season returning, and Wendy Osefo joining as the newest housewife. Following the COVID-19 pandemic in the United States, Bravo pulled the premiere and later announced the season to premiere on August 2, 2020. The season also featured a guest appearance from original housewife, Charrisse Jackson Jordan.

On December 27, 2020, following the season finale, Samuels announced her departure from the franchise. She stated: "It was a crazy ride. It's not easy doing reality TV, and to be quite honest, I'm over it. I appreciate everything people have done for me, everybody that has been Team Monique, I love y'all, I thank y'all. But when you cross certain lines, there's no going back. For me, my family is that line. The opinion of my family and my kids and what they think about anything that I do is more valuable to me than anybody's opinion, so I'm over it."

 Due to COVID-19 restrictions, the Housewives are seated in separate seats forming a semi-circle rather than the normal couches.

Episodes

References

External links
 
 
 

The Real Housewives of Potomac
2020 American television seasons